In number theory, an unusual number is a natural number n whose largest prime factor is strictly greater than .

A k-smooth number has all its prime factors less than or equal to k, therefore, an unusual number is non--smooth.

Relation to prime numbers
All prime numbers are unusual.
For any prime p, its multiples less than p2 are unusual, that is p, ... (p-1)p, which have a density 1/p in the interval (p, p2).

Examples
The first few unusual numbers are
 2, 3, 5, 6, 7, 10, 11, 13, 14, 15, 17, 19, 20, 21, 22, 23, 26, 28, 29, 31, 33, 34, 35, 37, 38, 39, 41, 42, 43, 44, 46, 47, 51, 52, 53, 55, 57, 58, 59, 61, 62, 65, 66, 67, ...  

The first few non-prime (composite) unusual numbers are
 6, 10, 14, 15, 20, 21, 22, 26, 28, 33, 34, 35, 38, 39, 42, 44, 46, 51, 52, 55, 57, 58, 62, 65, 66, 68, 69, 74, 76, 77, 78, 82, 85, 86, 87, 88, 91, 92, 93, 94, 95, 99, 102, ...

Distribution
If we denote the number of unusual numbers less than or equal to n by u(n) then u(n) behaves as follows:

Richard Schroeppel stated in 1972 that the asymptotic probability that a randomly chosen number is unusual is ln(2). In other words:

External links 
 

Integer sequences